Jack Berndhard Hermansson (born 10 June 1988) is a Swedish-Norwegian professional mixed martial artist. He currently competes in the middleweight division of the Ultimate Fighting Championship (UFC). He is the former middleweight champion in Cage Warriors and Warrior Fight Series. As of 7 March 2023, he is #10 in the UFC middleweight rankings.

Background
Hermansson was born and raised in Uddevalla, Sweden, on 10 June 1988, with six siblings. He started his martial arts career as a Greco-Roman wrestler in 1997, at age of 9. Later after training some Muay Thai and other disciplines, he transitioned to mixed martial arts in 2008.

Mixed martial arts career

Early career
Hermansson turned professional in 2010 and racked up a 5–0 record, all stoppages (4 KO's, 1 submission), in a little over a year. In his first fight, he won the title in the East Coast Fight Factory organization by a one-punch knockout in the third round. Two of the other victories, both by knockout, came in British top promotion Cage Warriors.

Bellator MMA
After his early career success, Hermansson was signed by Bellator MMA in 2012.

Hermansson made his promotional debut against Daniel Vizcaya on 14 December 2012, at Bellator 84. He lost the back-and-forth fight by split decision.

Hermansson next fought Jason Butcher on 21 March 2013, at Bellator 93. He lost the fight by submission due to a triangle choke.
This would mark the last fight for Hermansson in the promotion.

Independent promotions
After two fights overseas, Hermansson returned to Europe and Cage Warriors.

Hermansson's first outing came against Enoc Solves Torres on 22 March 2014, at Cage Warriors 66. He won the fight by TKO in the third round.

Less than a month later Hermansson took on Ion Pascu on 18 April 2014, at Cage Warriors: Fight Night 11. He won by unanimous decision, the first decision victory of his career.

Hermansson challenged for the promotional title against veteran and fellow former Bellator fighter Norman Paraisy on 7 June 2014, at Cage Warriors 69. He became the champion after he defeated Paraisy by submission due to a rear-naked choke at the end of round 4.

Hermansson defended his title against Deyan Topalski on 22 August 2014, at Cage Warriors 71. He won the fight by TKO in the first round.

In February 2015, the Cage Warriors promotion would become inactive after changing the leading staff. When and if the organization would return to make new events were unclear.
Hermansson himself would be out of action due to injuries for almost a year.

Hermansson returned in a title fight in British promotion Warrior Fight Series against UFC veteran Karlos Vemola on 1 August 2015, at Warrior Fight Series 4. He won the fight by submission due to an armbar in the first round to become the WFS champion.

Hermansson was scheduled to face Kévin Del on 29 November 2015, at Lion FC 6 for the promotional championship. However, Del would later withdraw from the contest citing an injury, and the bout was scrapped altogether.

Next Hermansson instead fought undefeated polish fighter Maciej Rozanski on 12 December 2015, at Venator FC 2. Hermansson won the fight by unanimous decision.

Hermansson was supposed to defend his WFS title on 13 February 2016, at Warrior Fight Series 5. No opponent was set, and later it was announced by the promotion that the title defense would not materialize at that event.

On 11 February 2016, after almost one and a half year of inactivity, Cage Warriors announced their return. Hermansson defended his CWFC title against Alan Carlos on the first event after the promotion's return on 15 April 2016, at Cage Warriors 75. He won the fight by knockout in the ending sequences of round three.

Hermansson faced Ireneusz Cholewa on 21 May 2016, at Venator FC 3. Hermansson won the fight via TKO in round 3.

Ultimate Fighting Championship

2016
On 31 May 2016, it was announced that Hermansson had signed with the UFC. He made his promotional debut against Scott Askham on 3 September 2016, at UFC Fight Night 93. He won the fight by unanimous decision.

Hermansson next faced Cezar Ferreira on 19 November 2016, at UFC Fight Night 100. He lost the fight via submission in the second round.

2017
Next Hermansson faced Alex Nicholson on 28 May 2017, at UFC Fight Night 109. This was the first time in his professional career that Hermansson fought in his native Sweden. He won the fight by TKO in the first round.

Hermansson next fought Brad Scott on 5 August 2017, at UFC Fight Night 114. He won the fight by TKO in the first round.

Hermansson faced Thiago Santos on 28 October 2017, at UFC Fight Night 119. He lost the fight via TKO in the first round.

2018
Hermansson faced Thales Leites on 12 May 2018, at UFC 224. Hermansson suffered a serious rib injury (costochondral separation) after being taken down in the first round. However, despite being in severe pain, he survived several submission attempts in the first and second round, and was able to rally back and win the fight via TKO in the third round.

Hermansson faced Gerald Meerschaert on 15 December 2018, at UFC on Fox 31. He won the fight by a guillotine choke submission in the first round.

2019
Hermansson next faced David Branch on 30 March 2019, at UFC on ESPN 2. He won the fight via submission due to a guillotine choke, 49 seconds into the first round. This win earned him the Performance of the Night award.

Hermansson had a quick turnaround as he replaced an injured Yoel Romero to face former Strikeforce middleweight champion Ronaldo Souza on 27 April 2019, in the main event at UFC Fight Night 150. He won the fight by unanimous decision.

On 17 July, it was reported that Hermansson signed a 6-fight deal with UFC.

Hermansson faced Jared Cannonier on 28 September 2019, in the main event of UFC Fight Night 160. He lost the fight via TKO in the second round.

2020
Hermansson was expected to face Chris Weidman on 2 May 2020, at UFC Fight Night: Hermansson vs. Weidman. However, on 9 April, Dana White, the president of UFC announced that the event was cancelled due to the COVID-19 pandemic.

Instead he faced Kelvin Gastelum on 19 July 2020, at UFC Fight Night 172. Hermansson won the fight by submission due to a heel hook in the first round.

Hermansson was scheduled to face Darren Till on 5 December 2020, at UFC on ESPN 19. However, Till was forced out of the bout on 6 November due to injury. Hermansson was then scheduled to face Kevin Holland at the event instead. The fight with Holland fell through on 28 November when it was revealed that Holland tested positive for COVID-19. Hermansson faced Marvin Vettori at the event instead. He lost the fight via unanimous decision. This fight earned him the Fight of the Night award.

2021
Hermansson was scheduled to face Edmen Shahbazyan on 15 May 2021, at UFC 262. However, due to Hermansson contracting COVID-19 the bout was postponed and took place at UFC Fight Night: Font vs. Garbrandt on 22 May 2021. He won the fight via unanimous decision after taking over with his grappling in rounds two and three.

2022
Hermansson faced Sean Strickland on 5 February 2022, at UFC Fight Night 200. He lost the fight via split decision.

Hermansson was scheduled to face Darren Till on 23 July 2022, at UFC Fight Night 208. Till was forced to pull out from the match due to an undisclosed injury and Hermansson instead faced Chris Curtis. He won the fight via unanimous decision.

Hermansson was scheduled to face Derek Brunson  on 3 December 2022, at UFC on ESPN 42. However, Brunson withdrew due to an undisclosed injury and was replaced by Roman Dolidze. Hermansson lost the bout via ground and pound TKO in the second round.

Personal life
Hermansson was raised in Uddevalla, Sweden with his five siblings before moving to Norway when he was 19 years old to find work. He settled in Oslo, where he also started training in MMA. He has said that he identifies as both Swedish and Norwegian, and when he fights, he represents both Sweden and Norway. Before focusing full-time on his fighting career he had various jobs, including working in a pet store, being a bartender and as a substitute teacher.

He and his girlfriend, Nora, have been in a relationship since 2012.

Hermansson competed against fellow UFC contender Khamzat Chimaev in a freestyle wrestling match on 19 November 2021, at Sweden-based Bulldog Fight Night 9, losing 8–0 on points.

Championships and accomplishments

Mixed martial arts
Ultimate Fighting Championship
Fight of the Night (One time) 
Performance of the Night (One time) 
Most significant strikes landed in a 5-round middleweight bout (148) 
Cage Warriors Fighting Championship
 CWFC Middleweight Championship (One time)
Two successful title defenses
Undefeated in the CWFC (7–0)
Warrior Fight Series
 WFS Middleweight Championship (One time)
East Coast Fight Factory
ECFF Middleweight Championship (One time)
Nordic MMA Awards – MMAViking.com
2014 Breakthrough Fighter of the Year
2018 Nordic Fighter of the Year
2018 Comeback of the Year vs. Thales Leites
2019 Submission of the Year vs. David Branch
2019 Fighter of the Year
2020 Submission of the Year vs. Kelvin Gastelum
CombatPress.com
2019 Upset of the Year vs. Ronaldo Souza

Submission Wrestling
Oslo Submission Series
OSS 2 (2016) Super Fight Winner

Mixed martial arts record

|-
|Loss
|align=center|23–8
|Roman Dolidze
|TKO (punches)
|UFC on ESPN: Thompson vs. Holland
|
|align=center|2
|align=center|4:06
|Orlando, Florida, United States
|
|-
|Win
|align=center|23–7
|Chris Curtis
|Decision (unanimous)
|UFC Fight Night: Blaydes vs. Aspinall 
|
|align=center|3
|align=center|5:00
|London, England
|
|-
|Loss
| align=center|22–7
|Sean Strickland
|Decision (split)
|UFC Fight Night: Hermansson vs. Strickland
| 
|align=center|5
|align=center|5:00
|Las Vegas, Nevada, United States
|
|-
|Win
|align=center|22–6
|Edmen Shahbazyan
|Decision (unanimous)
|UFC Fight Night: Font vs. Garbrandt 
|
|align=center|3
|align=center|5:00
|Las Vegas, Nevada, United States
|
|-
|Loss
|align=center|21–6
|Marvin Vettori
|Decision (unanimous)
|UFC on ESPN: Hermansson vs. Vettori
|
|align=center|5
|align=center|5:00
|Las Vegas, Nevada, United States
|
|-
|Win
|align=center|21–5
|Kelvin Gastelum
|Submission (heel hook)
|UFC Fight Night: Figueiredo vs. Benavidez 2 
|
|align=center|1
|align=center|1:18
|Abu Dhabi, United Arab Emirates
|
|-
|Loss
|align=center|20–5
|Jared Cannonier
|TKO (punches) 
|UFC Fight Night: Hermansson vs. Cannonier 
|
|align=center|2
|align=center|0:27
|Copenhagen, Denmark
|
|-
|Win
|align=center|20–4
|Ronaldo Souza
|Decision (unanimous)
|UFC Fight Night: Jacaré vs. Hermansson 
|
|align=center|5
|align=center|5:00
|Sunrise, Florida, United States
|
|-
|Win
|align=center|19–4
|David Branch
|Submission (guillotine choke)
|UFC on ESPN: Barboza vs. Gaethje 
|
|align=center|1
|align=center|0:49
|Philadelphia, Pennsylvania, United States
|
|-
|Win
|align=center|18–4
|Gerald Meerschaert
|Submission (guillotine choke)
|UFC on Fox: Lee vs. Iaquinta 2
|
|align=center|1
|align=center|4:25
|Milwaukee, Wisconsin, United States
|
|- 
|Win
|align=center|17–4
|Thales Leites
|TKO (punches)
|UFC 224
|
|align=center|3
|align=center|2:10
|Rio de Janeiro, Brazil
|
|-  
|Loss
|align=center|16–4
|Thiago Santos
|TKO (punches)
|UFC Fight Night: Brunson vs. Machida
|
|align=center|1
|align=center|4:59
|São Paulo, Brazil
|
|-
|Win
|align=center|16–3
|Brad Scott
|TKO (punches)
|UFC Fight Night: Pettis vs. Moreno
|
|align=center|1
|align=center|3:50
|Mexico City, Mexico
|
|-
|Win
|align=center|15–3
|Alex Nicholson
|TKO (punches)
|UFC Fight Night: Gustafsson vs. Teixeira
|
|align=center|1
|align=center|2:00
|Stockholm, Sweden
|
|-
|Loss
|align=center|14–3
|Cezar Ferreira
|Submission (arm-triangle choke)
|UFC Fight Night: Bader vs. Nogueira 2
|
|align=center|2
|align=center|2:11
|São Paulo, Brazil
|  
|-
|Win
|align=center|14–2
|Scott Askham
|Decision (unanimous)
|UFC Fight Night: Arlovski vs. Barnett
|
|align=center|3
|align=center|5:00
|Hamburg, Germany
| 
|-
| Win
|align=center|13–2
|Ireneusz Cholewa
|TKO (punches)
|Venator FC 3
|
|align=center|3
|align=center|1:05
|Milan, Italy
| 
|-
| Win
|align=center|12–2
|Alan Carlos
|TKO (punches)
|Cage Warriors FC 75
|
|align=center|3
|align=center|4:45
|London, England
|
|-
| Win
|align=center|11–2
|Maciej Różański
|Decision (unanimous)
|Venator FC 2
|
|align=center|3
|align=center|5:00
|Rimini, Italy
| 
|-
| Win
|align=center|10–2
|Karlos Vémola
|Submission (armbar)
|Warrior Fight Series 4
|
|align=center|1
|align=center|2:08
|London, England
|
|-
| Win
|align=center|9–2
|Deyan Topalski
|TKO (punches)
|Cage Warriors FC 71
|
|align=center|1
|align=center|4:09
|Amman, Jordan
|
|-
| Win
|align=center|8–2
|Norman Paraisy
|Submission (rear-naked choke)
|Cage Warriors FC 69
|
|align=center|4
|align=center|4:49
|London, England
|
|-
| Win
|align=center|7–2
|Ion Pascu
|Decision (unanimous)
|Cage Warriors FC: Fight Night 11
|
|align=center|3
|align=center|5:00
|Amman, Jordan
|
|-
|Win
|align=center|6–2
|Enoc Solves Torres
|TKO (submission to punches)
|Cage Warriors FC 66
|
|align=center|3
|align=center|4:36
|Ballerup, Denmark
| 
|-
|Loss
|align=center|5–2
|Jason Butcher
|Submission (triangle choke)
|Bellator 93
|
|align=center|1
|align=center|2:24
|Lewiston, Maine, United States
|
|-
|Loss
|align=center|5–1
|Daniel Vizcaya
|Decision (split)
|Bellator 84
|
|align=center|3
|align=center|5:00
|Hammond, Indiana, United States
|
|-
|Win
|align=center|5–0
|Mike Ling
|KO (punches)
|Cage Warriors: Fight Night 2
|
|align=center|1
|align=center|3:30
|Amman, Jordan
|
|-
|Win
|align=center|4–0
|Andor Filo
|KO (punch)
|World FC 2: Bad Boys
|
|align=center|1
|align=center|0:28
|London, England
|
|-
|Win
|align=center|3–0
|Ali Arish
|KO (punch and head kick)
|Cage Warriors: 41
|
|align=center|2
|align=center|1:39
|London, England
|
|-
|Win
|align=center|2–0
|Ian Farquharson
|Submission (rear-naked choke)
|Into the Cage 1
|
|align=center|1
|align=center|0:43
|Andover, England
|
|-
|Win
|align=center|1–0
|Chris Greig
|KO (punch)
|East Coast Fight Factory: Impact
|
|align=center|3
|align=center|0:46
|Norwich, England
|
|-

Amateur mixed martial arts record 

|-
| Win
|align=center| 2–0
| Martin Johansson
| TKO (knees)
| Adrenaline 4: The New Generation
| 
|align=center| 2
|align=center| N/A
| Copenhagen, Denmark
| 
|-
| Win
|align=center| 1–0
| Martin Lavin
| TKO (punches)
| Swedish Shootfighting League 09: Shoot Challenge 5
| 
|align=center| 2
|align=center| 1:02
| Stockholm, Sweden
|

References

External links
 
 

1988 births
Living people
Swedish male mixed martial artists
Middleweight mixed martial artists
Mixed martial artists utilizing Muay Thai
Mixed martial artists utilizing shootfighting
Mixed martial artists utilizing Greco-Roman wrestling
Swedish male sport wrestlers
People from Uddevalla Municipality
Swedish emigrants to Norway
Swedish Muay Thai practitioners
Norwegian male mixed martial artists
Norwegian male sport wrestlers
Norwegian Muay Thai practitioners
Ultimate Fighting Championship male fighters
Sportspeople from Västra Götaland County